Dhammin (Arabic: ضمّن) is a political platform that manages candidates' electoral campaigns for the National Assembly, Municipal Council or Cooperative Society councils of Kuwait. The platform was founded by Abdullah Al-Salloum and it is, according to news reports and interviews, the first within the field to apply distributed-systems' methodologies.

External links 
 Official website

References 

Political campaign technology
Political campaigning
Application software